Teacher Training College of Foreign Languages in Tychy (TTC Tychy)  is a Polish state college established in 1990. It trains teachers of English and German under the pedagogical guidance of the University of Silesia in Katowice.

Education in the college continues for three years and finishes with a diploma dissertation. The graduates are entitled to take the licencjat exam at the University of Silesia.  Once the graduates obtain the licencjat degree they are eligible to pursue a two-year Master of Arts degree.

Background 

In 1990 TTC Tychy was the first institution offering higher education in Tychy.  It was established to provide foreign language teachers, needed in the newly reformed Polish schools.

The college is located at al. Niepodległości 32. Up to 200 students can study there during the academic year enjoying, among other things, a modern language-lab, a multi-media lecture room, extensive specialist library, a language-teaching oriented computer lab and a gym.

TTC Tychy organizes Tyski Konkurs Języka Angielskiego i Języka Niemieckiego (a foreign language competition) for high school students, and several other events associated with foreign language teaching/learning.

References

Universities and colleges in Katowice
Educational institutions established in 1990
1990 establishments in Poland